Remu Darreh-ye Olya (also Romanized as Remū Darreh-ye ‘Olyā; also known as Remū Darreh) is a village in Hanza Rural District, Hanza District, Rabor County, Kerman Province, Iran. In the 2006 census, its population was listed as 76 individuals, from 20 different families.

References 

Populated places in Rabor County